Humala Airfield (ICAO: EEHA) is an airfield in Humala, Harju County, Estonia.

The airfield's owner is Urmas Sepp.

References

Buildings and structures in Harju County
Harku Parish